Richard David Huckabay, Sr (November 25, 1945 – March 10, 2006) was an American basketball coach, best known for his years as head coach at Marshall University.

Huckabay was born in Chicago but later moved with his family to Louisiana where he played high school baseball and basketball. He attended Louisiana Tech University and played baseball. After graduating, he became a high school basketball coach in that state. He then became an assistant coach at the Louisiana State University under Dale Brown.

In 1983 he was hired at Marshall, where he compiled a 129–59 record, including three appearances in the NCAA tournament and one in the NIT before resigning in 1989 amid an investigation into recruiting.

Following Huckabay's resignation and a divorce, he chose not to seek another college job, but remained in the Huntington, West Virginia area where he held several high school coaching jobs in the city's Ohio suburbs, in order to remain near his two sons.

After his sons reached adulthood, he returned to Louisiana where he was coaching high school basketball when diagnosed with terminal cancer.

Huckabay was inducted posthumously into the Marshall University Athletic Hall of Fame in 2006

Head coaching record

 
 
 
 
 
 

 The NCAA vacated Marshall's loss in the NCAA Tournament.

References

External links
 

1945 births
2006 deaths
Baseball players from Louisiana
Basketball coaches from Louisiana
High school basketball coaches in Louisiana
High school basketball coaches in Ohio
Louisiana Tech Bulldogs baseball players
LSU Tigers basketball coaches
Marshall Thundering Herd men's basketball coaches
Sportspeople from Chicago